Francis Patrick Kenrick (December 3, 1796 or 1797 –  July 8, 1863) was an Irish-born prelate of the Roman Catholic Church who served as the third Bishop of the Diocese of Philadelphia (1842–1851) and the sixth Archbishop of the Archdiocese of Baltimore (1851–1863).

Biography

Early life and education
Francis Kenrick was born in Dublin to Thomas and Jane (née Eustace) Kenrick. His younger brother, Peter, would later become the first Archbishop of St. Louis. His uncle was the pastor of St. Nicholas of Myra Church in Dublin, and took an active role in his education. 

At the age of eighteen, he was selected to study at the Pontifical Urbaniana University in Rome, where he became a distinguished student. He was ordained to the priesthood by Archbishop Candido Maria Frattini on April 7, 1821.

Ordination and ministry
Shortly after his ordination, Kenrick accepted an invitation from Bishop Benedict Joseph Flaget, S.S., to join the Diocese of Bardstown, Kentucky, in the United States. He then held the chair of theology at St. Thomas Seminary for nine years, in addition to teaching Greek and history at St. Joseph's College. 

Apart from his academic duties, he also engaged in missionary work; he facilitated several conversions and publicly debated with Protestant ministers. He earned a reputation as an eloquent preacher and effective apologist, and was a recognized theologian and scripture scholar.

Kenrick was later made private secretary to Flaget, whom he accompanied to the First Provincial Council of Baltimore in 1829 as his personal theologian. He also served as an assistant secretary of the Council.

Bishop of Philadelphia
On February 25, 1830, Kenrick was appointed Coadjutor Bishop of Philadelphia, and Titular Bishop of Arath by Pope Pius VIII. He received his episcopal consecration on the following June 6 from Flaget, with Bishops Henry Conwell and John Baptist Mary David, S.S., serving as co-consecrators, in Bardstown. 

Kenrick assumed full administrative powers from the aged Bishop Conwell, whose tenure had been plagued by a public feud with a schismatic priest named William Hogan. Immediately upon his arrival, he also became engaged in the long-running dispute between episcopal authority and the lay trustees of St. Mary's Church. 

The trustees eventually conceded their struggle for power after Kenrick placed St. Mary's Cathedral under interdict. He also placed all church property in the name of the bishop instead of those of the trustees.

In 1832, Kenrick founded St. Charles Borromeo Seminary, which was originally located at his personal residence. That same year an outbreak of cholera took place in Philadelphia. The Committee of the Almshouse, later known as Philadelphia General Hospital, asked Bishop Kenrick if he could request additional help from the Sisters of Charity to serve as nurses. Father Michael Hurley, pastor of St. Augustine's Church turned it into a makeshift hospital under the supervision of Dr. Oliver H. Taylor.

Kenrick led the local Catholic clergy and sisters in ministering to the sick; his efforts were publicly recognized by Mayor John Swift. 

Kenrick successfully petitioned the Holy See to separate Western Pennsylvania into a new diocese, and the Diocese of Pittsburgh was established in 1836; Kenrick was initially considered for the new diocese as well as for coadjutor bishop of New York, but withdrew his candidacy.

Kenrick succeeded Conwell as the third Bishop of Philadelphia upon the latter's death on April 22, 1842. As Bishop, Kenrick expressed public concern over the fact that Catholics in Philadelphia were forced to participate in Protestant religious instruction in the public schools. This dispute led to 1844 riots, a series of riots resulting from increasing anti-Catholic sentiment at the growing population of Irish Catholic immigrants. 

Although most of the patients cared for by the Sisters at St. Augustine were listed as non-Catholic, the church was burned to the ground during the riots. Throughout the violence, Kenrick encouraged Catholics "to follow peace and have charity." He closed all Catholic churches and ordered the suspension of all Masses until the riots were brought to a halt by military force. 

Following the riots, Kenrick ended his advocacy for changes in the religious instruction of public schools and initiated the creation of a Parochial school system designed for Catholic students and run by the Church.

Influenced by the work of his contemporary, an English priest named John Lingard, Kenrick published his own translation of the four Gospels in 1849; he eventually translated the entire Bible, as a new revision of the Douay-Rheims Bible.

Between 1830 and 1850, the number of churches in the diocese grew from 22 to 92; priests from 35 to 101; charitable institutions from two to six; and the Catholic population from 35,000 to 170,000. He also began construction on the Cathedral Basilica of Saints Peter and Paul and oversaw the rebuilding of St. Michael and St. Augustine following the 1844 riots.

Archbishop of Baltimore
Following the death of Archbishop Samuel Eccleston, S.S., Kenrick was named the sixth Archbishop of Baltimore, Maryland, by Pope Pius IX on August 19, 1851. His installation took place on the following October 9. He presided over the First Plenary Council of Baltimore in 1852.

As Archbishop of Baltimore, Kenrick expanded the Parochial School System beyond Philadelphia and help to make Catholic instruction the norm for Catholic children in America.  Under his tenure, parochial schools were free for all students, and were supported directly by the parishes.

In 1854, he was invited by Pius IX to attend the promulgation of the dogma of the Immaculate Conception in Rome. In 1858, the Sacred Congregation for the Propagation of the Faith, with the approval of Pius IX, conferred a "prerogative of place" on the Archbishop of Baltimore over all archbishops and bishops in the United States, regardless of seniority in promotion or ordination.

Death and legacy
In his later years, Archbishop Kenrick struggled to reduce tensions between Catholics and the Protestant majority.  While several anti-Catholic Riots took place in the US during the 1850s, none took place in Kenrick's archdiocese except the Know-Nothing Riots of 1856.

Kenrick was greatly troubled by the outbreak of the Civil War.  He died aged 66 on July 8, 1863, shortly after reading of the massive slaughter that had taken place in nearby Gettysburg, Pennsylvania. (The entire state was part of his ecclesiastical province at the time.)

Kenrick will be remembered primarily for his contribution to the development of the US Parochial School System. His best known literary works include the following:

 A new translation of the Douay Bible, with a commentary;
 Theologia Moralis (3 Vols) (1860); 
 The Primacy of the Apostolic See, Vindicated (1848); 
 A Treatise on Baptism (1852);
 Theologia dogmatica. Secundis curis auctoris (1858);
 A Vindication of the Catholic Church, in a Series of Letters Addressed to the Rt. Rev. John Henry Hopkins (1855).

See also

 Catholic Church hierarchy
 Catholic Church in the United States
 Historical list of the Catholic bishops of the United States
 List of Catholic bishops of the United States
 Lists of patriarchs, archbishops, and bishops

Notes
Parts of Francis Kenrick's Bible Translation
Marschall, John P.,Francis Patrick Kenrick, 1851-1863: The Baltimore Years (Ph.D. diss., Catholic University of America, 1965)
Spalding, Thomas W. The Premier See: A History of the Archdiocese of Baltimore, 1789-1989. Baltimore, MD: Johns Hopkins University Press, 1989

References

External links

  Kennedy-Kenrick Catholic High School
 Kenrick's Bible Editions
 Roman Catholic Archdiocese of Baltimore

1796 births
1863 deaths
19th-century Irish Roman Catholic priests
Christian clergy from Dublin (city)
Irish emigrants to the United States (before 1923)
19th-century Roman Catholic archbishops in the United States
American Roman Catholic clergy of Irish descent
Roman Catholic bishops of Philadelphia
Roman Catholic archbishops of Baltimore
Translators of the Bible into English
Burials at the Basilica of the National Shrine of the Assumption of the Blessed Virgin Mary
19th-century translators